Presidencia de la Plaza is a  department of Chaco Province in Argentina.

The provincial subdivision has a population of about 12,000 inhabitants in an area of  2,284 km2, and its capital city is Presidencia de la Plaza, which is located around 1,120 km from the Capital federal.

Settlements

Fortin Aguilar
Paso de Oso
Presidencia de la Plaza

Attractions
The Parque Nacional Chaco (Chaco National Park) is partially situated in the Presidencia de la Plaza Department. The park consists of woodland, rivers and lakes. Native Fauna include Tapirs, Monkeys, Armadillos and Viscachas.

References

External links
Parque Nacional Chaco (Spanish)

Departments of Chaco Province